A, Domo. Ohisashiburi Desu.  (Japanese: あっ、ども。おひさしぶりです。, "Oh, Hi. Long Time No See.") is the second studio album by Japanese band GReeeeN. It was released on June 25, 2008, and is certified by RIAJ for shipment of 1 million copies.

Track listing
Source: Oricon
 SUN SHINE!!
 Mata ne. (またね。) 
 Kiseki
 Kimi Omoi (君想い) 
 Hito (人)
 Sayonara Kara Hajimeyou (サヨナラから始めよう) 
 Chikyuu-gou (地球号) 
 Tabidachi (旅立ち)
 no more war 
 BE FREE 
 Boyonka Boyoyonka ~Yukai na Otona-tachi~ feat. 2BACKKA & UNITEBUS 
 Namidazora (涙空))
 Yozora no Kiseki ~Orgel version~ (夜空のキセキ)

Covers
"Kiseki" was covered by Andrew W.K., Kazunari Ninomiya, C.J. Lewis, Shigeru Matsuzaki and Choi Min-ho. A cover performed by Rie Takahashi was used as an ending theme for the anime Teasing Master Takagi-san 2. Fujin Rizing!, a fictional ska band from multimedia franchise Argonavis from BanG Dream! was also covered the song and added in the game started on January 14, 2021.

Charts (Japan)

Sales in 2008: 778,578
Sales in 2009: 122,482

References 

2008 albums
Greeeen albums